King of the Grizzlies is a 1970 adventure film directed by Ron Kelly and written by Jack Speirs, Rod Peterson and Norman Wright as a loose adaptation of Ernest Thompson Seton's 1900 novel Biography Of A Grizzly. The film stars John Yesno, Chris Wiggins, Hugh Webster and Jack Van Evera. The film was released on February 11, 1970, by Buena Vista Distribution.

Plot
Moki, a Cree Indian in the late 19th-century West, works as a foreman on the ranch belonging to his former Army commanding officer, Colonel Pierson. Moki wears the sign of the tribal totem on his hand—a four-toed track, the mark of the grizzly bear. A grizzly bear invades Pierson's land and kills a steer. Pierson shoots the bear and one of her cubs, missing the other. The surviving cub falls over a cliff and into a river and is swept downstream.

Moki searches for the cub and learns that it has only four toes on one of its feet. He names it Wahb, which means four-toed grizzly. He captures the bear, and sets him free on the outskirts of Pierson's land. Wahb survives and grows to maturity. At 3 years of age, Wahb appears and frightens a ranch hand, whereupon Pierson orders Moki to trap the bear; but Wahb avoids capture.

Several years later, Moki encounters Wahb in the mountains. As the bear does not harm him, Moki concludes that a mystical tie binds Wahb's destiny with his own. Wahb reappears on the Pierson ranch at roundup time and stampedes the cattle. Pierson sets out to kill Wahb, but the wily bear doubles back and begins to track his pursuer. Moki attempts to warn Pierson of his danger but to no avail. Pierson meets the bear head on; his horse rears and Pierson is thrown. Wahb is about to attack Pierson when Moki arrives as he climbs down to the colonel.

As he is examining the colonel's injuries, Wahb appears. Moki is armed with only a pistol which is definitely not sufficient to stop an angry grizzly bear. Wahb departs, leaving Moki and consequently Colonel Pierson unharmed. Moki attempts to get him to stop, but his mind is made up. Just when the colonel is about to pull the trigger, Wahb begins to mark a tree with his claws. Moki tells the colonel that, because of this, Wahb will not return to the Gray Bull (which is true; he will stay and protect his territory). Still unconvinced, Colonel Pierson raises his gun one more time. But again Moki calls his name, and, when the colonel turns, he sees the rifle shells in Moki's hand. Seeing how much the bear means to Moki and hoping he will stay away from the Gray Bull now, Colonel Pierson relents, and they go home.

Cast
 Big Ted as Wahb
 John Yesno as Moki
 Chris Wiggins as Colonel Pierson
 Hugh Webster as Shorty Russell
 Jack Van Evera as Slim
 Winston Hibler as the narrator

See also
 List of American films of 1970

References

External links 
 

1970 films
Walt Disney Pictures films
American adventure films
1970s adventure films
Films about bears
Films set in 1899
Films directed by Ron Kelly
Films scored by Buddy Baker (composer)
Canadian adventure films
English-language Canadian films
Films produced by Winston Hibler
Films about Native Americans
1970s English-language films
1970s American films
1970s Canadian films